Six ships of the Royal Navy have borne the name HMS Coquette. A seventh was ordered but never completed:

  was a 28-gun sixth rate captured from the French in 1783 and in service in 1785.
  was a 20-gun sixth rate launched in 1807 and sold in 1817. She became a whaler and was lost in 1835.
 HMS Coquette was to have been an 18-gun corvette. She was ordered in 1835 and cancelled in 1851.
  was a wooden  screw gunvessel launched in 1855 and broken up in 1868.
  was an  composite screw gunboat launched in 1871 and sold in 1889.
  was a  destroyer launched in 1897 and sunk by a mine from a German submarine in 1916 (22 casualties).
  was an  launched in 1943 and scrapped in 1958.

Royal Navy ship names